The European Cup is a former athletics competition for European teams that was replaced by the European Team Championships starting in 2009. The European Cup saw most of the major nations of Europe compete. Originally known as the Bruno Zauli Cup, it first took place in 1965 in Stuttgart (men) and Kassel (women), Germany. Initially, the competition was a bi-annual event (tri-annual once); however, from 1993, it took place once every year.

History
The main idea of the cup, developed by Bruno Zauli, president of the European Committee of the International Association of Athletics Federations, was to create a competition for all European athletics federations, in which they would face each other in track and field events. Although Zauli died a few months before the launch of the first event, the competition has gone from strength to strength.

The competition always had different leagues through which countries had to progress. For the first twenty years, there were different groups (leagues) that took place at different times. Smaller nations, like Luxembourg and Switzerland, would compete in preliminary rounds, before larger countries, such as the United Kingdom and France, would join in the semi-finals. The top two countries from three semi-finals would enter into the final.

This formula was fairly successful; however, by 1983 the number of competitions that athletes were expected to compete in made it extremely difficult for countries to send their best team to each event. The format of the cup had to be changed so that each country in the whole cup competed on the same day.

The top league was named the Super League and contained eight male and eight female teams. The male and female teams were separate teams, which meant that the female team of one country could get relegated while their male counterpart would stay in the Super League as long as they had enough points. Below the Super League were the First and Second Leagues, which contained other European countries that did not qualify for the finals.

European Team Championships

In 2009, the competition took a new format, European Team Championships. There are now four leagues, which consist of 20 events for men and 20 for women. The Super League and the First League have 12 teams each, while the Second League and the Third League 8 and 14 respectively. Team scores are calculated by combination of men and women's points.

Scoring system and relegation
Countries scored points for their performance in each race/event:
The winning athlete received 8 points for their country, and this then carried on so second would get 7 points, third 6 points, etc.  In the case of an athlete that did not finish a race, was disqualified or did not record a mark (as the case may be), their country would receive zero points for that event.

The male and female team with the most points was declared the winner. The four winning teams from the 'Super League' (two male and two female) went on to compete as individual countries in the IAAF World Cup in Athletics.

Since 1983, the lowest scoring male, and the lowest scoring female teams in the 'Super League' were relegated down into the 'First League'. These were replaced by the highest scoring male and female teams from the 'First League'. This process was repeated for relegation/promotion from the second to the first league. This system allowed countries to progress, and for a wider range of athletes to compete against opposition they might not normally face.

League positions in 2009
The leagues for the 2009 competition were formed by combination of each country's men and women's performances in 2008. As the teams are 46, the winning team received 46 points, the second 45 and so on. The new leagues are:

Winners

Best performances
Below is a list of the events that took place at the championships, and what is the European Cup record, who set it, what country they represented and which year.

Hosts

See also
European Athletics Association
European Athletics Indoor Cup
European Athletics Team Championships

References

External links
 Málaga 2006 Official Website
 Málaga 2006 Schedule
 European Cup Memories
 Bulletin for 2007 event (pdf)

 
Recurring sporting events established in 1965
Team combination track and field competitions
Cup
Recurring events disestablished in 2008
Defunct athletics competitions
European international sports competitions